"Last Cheater's Waltz"  is the title track from Sonny Throckmorton's 1978 album Last Cheater's Waltz. Throckmorton released the song as a double-A-side with "Smooth Sailin'" and charted at number 47 on the Hot Country Songs charts that year.

In late 1979, T. G. Sheppard covered both songs. He released "Last Cheater's Waltz" as a single in 1979, reaching number one on Hot Country Songs.

Charts

Weekly charts

Year-end charts

References

1978 singles
1979 singles
Songs written by Sonny Throckmorton
1978 songs
T. G. Sheppard songs
Sonny Throckmorton songs
Song recordings produced by Buddy Killen
Warner Records singles
Curb Records singles